Regentair was an airline with its headquarters in Westchester, Los Angeles, California. The airline, founded in October 1982 as Firstair, operated scheduled flights as Regent Air between Newark Airport (EWR) in the New York City area and Los Angeles (LAX) with Boeing 727-100 jetliners with their schedules appearing in the Feb. 15, 1985 Official Airline Guide (OAG) with one round trip flight a day except on Saturdays being operated between Newark and L.A. at this time. According to a Regent Air service brochure, its 727 aircraft were configured to carry just 30 passengers in an all first class cabin with the statement that "Regent Air is an experience in luxury that has no parallel in travel". The airline's aircraft were also available for charter.  The airline offered complimentary limousine as well as connecting helicopter service for their flights, but fares were 50% higher than their competition's prices.

From 1982 to 1985, when the Transportation Department approved its operation as a scheduled carrier, it had operated entirely as a charter service.  Approval had been withheld because of the corporation's ties to persons alleged to have ties to organized crime.

Regent Tours International acquired the airline in January 1986.  Shortly after this acquisition, Regentair announced plans to initiate operations to Honolulu, Hawaii using Boeing 747s from Los Angeles and other United States cities.  However, it appears the 747 service to Hawaii never got off the ground according to flight schedules in the OAG at the time.

Fleet in 1985

The airline was operating the following aircraft in 1985:

 Three (3) Boeing 727-100 (B727-191 aircraft:  registrations N502RA, N503RA and N504RA)

References

External links
 
  (Photo of Regent Boeing 727)
  (Photo of Regent Boeing 727)

Companies based in Los Angeles